James W. Walsh (born 1964) is a Republican member of the Washington State House of Representatives.

Walsh attended Amherst College, graduating in 1986. He lives in Aberdeen with the youngest of his five children, who attends school in the area. His wife was killed in a car crash on October 24, 2022 after a logging truck swerved into her lane on Highway 101. He was first elected to the state legislature in 2016. He represents the 19th Legislative District, including parts of Grays Harbor, Pacific, Cowlitz, Wahkiakum, and Lewis counties.

In October 2018, roughly two weeks before the elections, Walsh was sued by two constituents for banning them from his Facebook page. The constituents argued that Walsh's actions constituted a violation of their first amendment rights. Walsh countered that they were blocked from his page for defaming his supporters and specifically bashing on Christians, claiming he had warned them to stop their disruptive posts on multiple occasions before finally removing them.  The chief plaintiff in the lawsuit, Jeff Nichols of Montesano, was the outgoing chair of the 19th Legislative District Democrats at the time.

In 2021, Walsh wore a yellow Star of David (the symbol that Nazis forced Jews to wear during the Holocaust), likening individuals who refuse to vaccinate against COVID-19 to the Jews in Nazi Germany. Walsh said, "In the current context, we’re all Jews." The Seattle-based Holocaust Center for Humanity said that Walsh trivialized the Holocaust and distorted history.

In August 2021, Walsh and four other state Republican lawmakers were said to sponsor an unofficial hearing with the aim of possibly calling for a "forensic audit" to take place in Washington State similar to the criticized Arizona audit. The group that organized the event also invited figures who have openly claimed there was voter fraud in the 2020 presidential election. Walsh did not end up attending the hearing. 

Representative Walsh currently serves on the following committees for the 2023-2024 session:

Civil Rights & Judiciary Committee, Ranking minority member
Education Committee, Asst. ranking minority member
State Government & Tribal Relations Committee, Asst. ranking minority member
House Transportation Committee

Representative Walsh is actively considering a run for Washington’s Third Congressional District after Joe Kent’s unexpected loss.

References

Republican Party members of the Washington House of Representatives
Living people
21st-century American politicians
1964 births